Manipal College of Dental Sciences, Mangalore was founded in 1987 and recognised by the Dental Council of India in 1992 and by the Malaysian Dental Council in 2003. It was certified for ISO9001:2000 in 2006 and was re-certified for ISO9001:2008 in 2009. The college is a part of Manipal University. The college offers undergraduate (BDS) and postgraduate (MDS) programme.

Courses 
Manipal College of Dental Sciences runs an undergraduate programme of four years followed by one year of internship which leads to a Bachelor of Dental Surgery (BDS) degree and the postgraduate programme of three years leads to a Master of Dental Surgery (MDS) degree. MDS is offered in following specialties:
 Oral Medicine and Radiology
 Conservative Dentistry and Endodontics
 Oral and Maxillofacial Surgery
 Paedodontics and Preventive Dentistry
 Periodontics
 Orthodontics and Orofacial Orthopaedics
 Oral and Maxillofacial Pathology and Oral Microbiology
 Public Health Dentistry
 Prosthodontics and Maxillofacial Prosthesis

Apart from these, the institute offers an M.Sc. (Master of Science) degree in Dental Materials.

Infrastructure 
The institution has 260 dental chairs. Facilities include a library, lecture halls with audio-visual aids, phantom head labs for pre-clinical training and seminar/CDE rooms. Hostel facilities are available for boys and girls. Transport is provided from the hostels to the institution.

The institute is divided into Light House Hill Road Campus and Attavar Campus.

The first-year BDS students undergo training at the Centre for Basic Sciences, Bejai with separate hostel facilities provided at the same campus. The undergraduate and postgraduate training for both pre-clinical and clinical aspects are imparted at the Light House Hill and Attavar campuses. Clinical facilities for training in medical subjects are available at the Kasturba Medical College Hospital, Attavar which is a 651-bed hospital.

Teaching staff 
The college undertakes dental camps in rural areas as a part of the training. Student evaluation of staff performance is also carried out regularly.

 Dean: Dr. Dilip G Nayak, MDS (Perio)
 Associate dean: Dr. Junaid Ahmed, MDS (Oral Medicine and Radiology)
 Associate dean: ,Dr Premalatha K.,  MDS (Oral and Maxillofacial Surgery)

Heads of departments are:
 Oral Medicine and Radiology: Dr. Ravi Kiran Ongole, MDS
 Conservative Dentistry and Endodontics: Dr Karthik shetty, MDS
 Oral and Maxillofacial Surgery: Dr Premalatha K., MDS
 Paedodontics and Preventive Dentistry: Dr. Arathi Rao, MDS
 Periodontics: Dr Neetha J Shetty, MDS
 Orthodontics and Orofacial Orthopaedics: Dr. Siddarth Shetty, MDS
 Oral and Maxillofacial Pathology and Oral Microbiology: Dr. Srikant N, MDS 
 Public Health Dentistry: Dr. Ashwini Rao, MDS
 Prosthodontics and Maxillofacial Prosthesis: Dr Shobha J. Rodrigues, MDS
 Dental Materials: Dr.Ravindra Kotian, M.Tech

Former Dean, Dr. V. Surendra Shetty took over the charge of Pro Vice Chancellor Manipal University (Mangalore Campus) from July 2012.

Admission 
The institution enrols undergraduates and postgraduate students through an online entrance test, conducted in April–May. The test consists of multiple choice questions from Physics, Chemistry, Biology and English.

See also 
 Manipal University
 Mangalore
 KMC Hospital, Mangalore

References

Universities and colleges in Mangalore
Dental colleges in Karnataka
Manipal Academy of Higher Education schools
1987 establishments in Karnataka
Educational institutions established in 1987